The 2009–10 Northwestern Wildcats women's basketball team will represent the Northwestern University in the 2009–10 NCAA Division I women's basketball season. The Wildcats will be coached by Joe McKeown. The Wildcats are a member of the Big Ten Conference and will attempt to win the NCAA championship.

Offseason
May 5: Northwestern will host Clemson in the third-annual Big Ten/ACC Challenge Women's Basketball Challenge. The contest pits the two teams in a re-match from Clemson's 78–75 overtime victory in South Carolina last season.
May 11: Northwestern announced the signing of Inesha Hale to a National Letter of Intent. Hale is a 5–9 point guard from Raytown, MO and joins two early period signees, Inga Orekhova and Dannielle Diamant as part of next year's class. According to ESPN HoopGurlz, Northwestern's class was ranked as 27th nationally prior to Hale's signing. Hale was ranked No. 14 at the point guard position by Scouts, Inc., and was tabbed No. 87 nationally overall by ESPN's Hoopgurlz.
May 13: Center Amy Jaeschke was selected to participate in the USA Basketball 2009 Women's World University Games National Trials. The tryouts will be held May 14–17 at the U.S. Olympic Training Center in Colorado Springs, Colo.
July 1: Kendall Hackney (Cincinnati, Ohio/Mount Notre Dame) was added to the 2009–10 Wildcat freshmen class. Hackney is Ohio's Miss Basketball and joins fellow top-100 signees Inga Orekhova (No. 40), Inesha Hale (No. 87) and Dannielle Diamant.

Exhibition

Regular season

Roster

Schedule

Player stats

Postseason

NCAA basketball tournament

Awards and honors

Team players drafted into the WNBA

References

External links
Official Site

Northwestern Wildcats women's basketball seasons
Northwestern
Northwestern Wild
Northwestern Wild